The Musunuri Nayakas were Telugu warrior kings of 14th-century South India who were briefly significant in the region of Telangana and Andhra Pradesh. Musunuri Kapaya Nayaka is said to have taken a leadership role among the Andhra chieftains and driven out the Delhi Sultanate from Warangal. But his rise was soon challenged by the Bahmani Sultanate and he was defeated. The Recherla Nayakas wrested power from him in 1368.

Origins
Little is known of the Musunuri family; they are often described as "obscure".  The founding ruler of the family, Musunuri Prolaya Nayaka, suddenly appears as a new ruler at Rekapalle, near Bhadrachalam, around 1330, claiming heritage from the Kakatiyas.

Andhra historians often state that Musunuri Nayaks belonged to the Kamma caste group.

Opposition to the Delhi Sultanate's Invasion
After the fall of the Kakatiyas, their empire was annexed by the Delhi Sultanate. Ulugh Khan (also known as Muhammad bin Tughluq), the general that conquered Warangal, renamed it "Sultanpur" and remained as the governor of the region for a short period. In 1324, he was recalled to Delhi to succeed the Khaljis as Muhammad bin Tughluq. A former Kakatiya commander, Nagaya Ganna Vibhudu, now renamed Malik Maqbul, was appointed as the governor of the region. However, the Tughluq hold over the erstwhile Kakatiya empire was tenuous and a number of local chieftains seized effective power.

Prolaya Nayaka

According to the Vilasa grant, Prolaya Nayaka ruled from Rekapalle. Located at the edge of the Papikondalu hills (part of the Eastern Ghats), Rekapalle could control the narrow Sabari river valley lying between the Bhadrachalam forest and the Papikondalu forest. Konda Reddis, who populate the hill forests would have facilitated Prolaya Nayaka's rebellion against the Sultanate. Rekapalle is also a strategic location to control or obstruct communications on the Godavari river passing through the hills.

Prolaya Vema Reddi of the Panta Reddi clan, who seems to have established his own independent rule in Addanki by 1325, is believed to have taken control of the region between the Krishna and Godavari rivers, perhaps up to Rajahmundry. Historian M. Rama Rao states that Prolayavema Reddi and Prolaya Nayaka must have made a 'joint effort' to drive the Muslim rule out from the area.

In 1330, Prolaya Nayaka published the Vilasa grant, a copper-plate grant near Pithapuram, in which he bemoaned the devastation of the Telugu country brought about by northern Muslim armies and attempted to legitimise himself as the rightful restorer of order. Prolaya Nayaka left no children and was succeeded by a cousin, Kapaya Nayaka, who governed until 1368 and attempted to further expand his rule.

Kapaya Nayaka

Rebellion

Musunuri Kapaya Nayaka (r. 1333–1368) led a larger rebellion against the Tughluq rule, driving it out of Warangal in 1336. According to the Kaluvacheru grant of Anithalli, a female member of the Panta Reddi clan in 1423, Kapaya Nayaka was assisted by 75 Nayakas. The grant also states that Prolaya Vema Reddi was one among these 75 Nayakas, but this is doubtful.

Muhammad bin Tughluq, who became the Sultan of Delhi in 1324, witnessed numerous rebellions starting in 1330, first in the immediate vicinity in the Ganga-Yamuna doab, which caused a famine in Delhi, and rebellions within ranks in Ma'bar (Madurai) and Bengal. It is possible that Kapaya Nayaka advanced in the direction of Warangal in this period, acquiring some of its territory. Consequently, Telangana was also counted among the rebellious territories. In 1334–35, the Sultan marched on Deccan in an attempt to quell the rebellions, but his army was struck by some kind of epidemic and the Sultan himself fell gravely ill. He was forced to retreat to Delhi via Daulatabad. It is said that about a third of his army perished due to the epidemic.

Ferishta narrates that, around this time, Kapaya Nayaka approached the Hoysala ruler Veera Ballala III for assistance in evicting the Sultanate from Warangal. After consideration, assistance was offered.

Historian R. C. Majumdar characterises it as a 'national revolt' backed up by a regular army. Governor Malik Maqbul found himself unable to withstand the rebellion and fled to Delhi. Ferishta states that Kapaya Nayaka and Ballala III then jointly marched on the newly declared Madurai Sultanate and divested it of its outlying territories, in particular Tondaimandalam.

Rule
Kapaya Nayaka took control of Warangal from Malik Maqbul in 1336 and thus also of a wider swathe of eastern Telangana that was governed from there. He also tried to support other rebels in the surrounding areas, although in the case of aid given to Alauddin Bahman Shah, the outcome was that his fellow rebel turned on him. Several military engagements with Bahaman Shah followed over a period of years, during which Kapaya Nayaka had to cede various forts and territories, including Golconda (near the modern Hyderabad). His weakened position was exploited by the Reddis of Kondavidu and the Recherla Nayakas, the latter of whom killed him in battle at Bhimavaram in 1368.

Despite his supposed opposition to the Dehlavi Sultans, Kapaya Nayaka continued using the Kush Mahal built by the Sultans in Warangal and adopted the Persianised title "Sultan of the Andhra country" (Andhra Suratrana). In 1361, he gifted to the Bahmani Sultan Mohammed Shah I the turquoise throne of Warangal, made during the Delhi rule, as part of a treaty agreement.

Ater the death of Kapaya Nayaka, his allied Nayakas are said to have returned to their own towns, and the period of Musunuri family ended. The Recherla Nayakas became the dominant power in the Telangana that lasted till 1435.

Notes

References

Bibliography

Further reading
 
 A history of South India from prehistoric times to the fall of Vijayanagar, K. A. Nilakanta Sastri, Oxford Univ. Press, 1955.

States and territories established in the 13th century
States and territories disestablished in the 14th century
Dynasties of India
Telugu monarchs